Roger Quemener (17 June 1941 – 18 July 2021) was a French racewalker, who was a legend of the Ultramarathon race Paris-Colmar winning seven times. He thus had the record number of wins, until Polish racewalker Grzegorz Adam Urbanowski brought it to ten wins.

Career
Of Breton descent, Quemener joined the Parisian police in 1963, and later became a member of the AS Police Paris sporting association. He only started top-level sport at 28 years old. He contested mainly long-distance races, he was French champion in the 100 kilometers in 1971, 1972 and 1975.
In 1979 Quemener won the classic Paris-Strasbourg. Subsequently, he won the same race in 1983, known as Paris-Colmar since 1981, and five times consecutively from 1985 to 1989. He used to stop to get shaved before the arrival at Colmar to cross the finish line with a clean-shaven face. Later Quemener became  deputy director of the competition.

Awards
 Golden medal of Youth and Sports - 1986

References

External links
Google Plus
Tout sur Roger quemener l'empereur de la marche (forum)

1941 births
2021 deaths
French ultramarathon runners
French police officers
French male racewalkers
French people of Breton descent
Male ultramarathon runners